Senegalia flagellaris is a species of plant in the family Fabaceae. It is found only in Somalia.

References

flagellaris
Vulnerable plants
Endemic flora of Somalia
Taxonomy articles created by Polbot